Angle Peak is a  mountain summit located in Jasper National Park, in the Canadian Rockies of Alberta, Canada. Angle Peak was named for the fact it stands where the ridge makes a bend. The descriptive name was applied in 1916 by Morrison P. Bridgland (1878-1948), a Dominion Land Surveyor who named many peaks in Jasper Park and the Canadian Rockies.  The mountain's name was made official in 1935 by the Geographical Names Board of Canada. The mountain is situated in the Tonquin Valley, with Angle Glacier on its north slope, Alcove Mountain to its immediate west, The Ramparts 10 kilometres to the northwest, and Mount Edith Cavell 12 km to the northeast.


Climate

Based on the Köppen climate classification, Angle Peak is located in a subarctic climate with cold, snowy winters, and mild summers.

See also
Tonquin Valley
Geography of Alberta

References

External links
 National Park Service web site: Jasper National Park

Angle Peak
Angle Peak
Alberta's Rockies